Mansoa verrucifera is a species of liana in the family Bignoniaceae. It is native to Mexico, Guyana, and Venezuela. M. verrucifera bears long, narrow fruit, and has trifoliolate leaves that grow oppositely.

References

Flora of Guyana
Flora of Mexico
Flora of Venezuela
verrucifera
Vines